Detroit High School is a public high school located in Detroit, Texas (USA) and classified as a 2A school by the UIL.  It is part of the Detroit Independent School District located in west central Red River County.  In 2015, the school was rated "Met Standard" by the Texas Education Agency.

Athletics
The Detroit Eagles compete in these sports - 

Cross Country, Volleyball, Football, Basketball, Golf, Track, Softball & Baseball

State Titles
Girls Track - 
1991(1A)

References

External links
Detroit ISD

Schools in Red River County, Texas
Public high schools in Texas